Kannadanadu may refer to:
Karnataka, a state in India
Kannada Nadu Party, a political party in Karnataka, now merged into the Janata Dal

See also
Kannada (disambiguation)